Down is the fourth album by the Finnish metal band Sentenced, released in November 1996 via Century Media. It is also the first album including the vocalist Ville Laihiala. This album is the band's first pure gothic metal album.

Track listing 

2007 reissue bonus track

Credits 
 Ville Laihiala – vocals
 Miika Tenkula – guitar, bass
 Sami Lopakka – guitar
 Vesa Ranta – drums

Guest musicians
 Waldemar Sorychta – keyboards
 Birgit Zacher – backing vocals
 Vorph (of Samael) – growl vocals on "Bleed", "Keep My Grave Open" and "Warrior of Life (Reaper Redeemer)"

References 

1996 albums
Sentenced albums
Century Media Records albums
Albums produced by Waldemar Sorychta